The south-pointing chariot (or carriage) was an ancient Chinese two-wheeled vehicle that carried a movable pointer to indicate the south, no matter how the chariot turned. Usually, the pointer took the form of a doll or figure with an outstretched arm. The chariot was supposedly used as a compass for navigation and may also have had other purposes.

The ancient Chinese invented a mobile-like armored cart in the 5th century BC called the Dongwu Che. It was used for the purpose of protecting warriors on the battlefield. The Chinese war wagon was designed as a kind of mobile protective cart with a shed-like roof. It would serve to be rolled up to city fortifications to provide protection for sappers digging underneath to weaken a wall's foundation. The early Chinese war wagon became the basis of technologies for the making of ancient Chinese south-pointing chariots.

There are legends of earlier south-pointing chariots, but the first reliably documented one was created by the Chinese mechanical engineer Ma Jun ( – 265) of Cao Wei during the Three Kingdoms. No ancient chariots still exist, but many extant ancient Chinese texts mention them, saying they were used intermittently until about 1300. Some include information about their inner components and workings.

There were probably several types of south-pointing chariot which worked differently. In most or all of them, the rotating road wheels mechanically operated a geared mechanism to keep the pointer aimed correctly. The mechanism had no magnets and did not automatically detect which direction was south. The pointer was aimed southward by hand at the start of a journey. Subsequently, whenever the chariot turned, the mechanism rotated the pointer relative to the body of the chariot to counteract the turn and keep the pointer aiming in a constant direction, to the south. Thus the mechanism did a kind of directional dead reckoning, which is inherently prone to cumulative errors and uncertainties. Some chariots' mechanisms may have had differential gears.

Historical texts

Earliest sources

The south-pointing chariot, a mechanical-geared, wheeled vehicle used to discern the southern cardinal direction (without magnetics), was given a brief description by Ma's contemporary Fu Xuan. The contemporary 3rd century source of the Weilüe, written by the East Han dynasty politician Yuan Huan also described the south-pointing chariot of belonging to the Chinese mechanical engineer and politician Ma Jun. The Jin dynasty (266–420) era text of the Shu Zheng Ji (Records of Military Expeditions), written by Guo Yuansheng, recorded that south-pointing chariots were often stored in the northern gatehouse of the Government Workshops (Shang Fang) of the capital city. However, the later written Song Shu (Book of Song) (6th century) recorded the south-pointing chariot's design and use in further detail, as well as creating the background legend of the device's (supposed) use long before Ma's time, in the Western Zhou dynasty (1050–771 BC). The book also provided a description of the south-pointing chariot's re-invention and use in times after Ma Jun and the Three Kingdoms. The 6th century text, translated by the British scientist and historian Joseph Needham, reads as follows (the south-pointing chariot is referred to as the south-pointing carriage):

The last sentence of the passage is of great interest for navigation at sea, since the magnetic compass used for seafaring navigation was not used until the time of Shen Kuo (1031–1095). Although the Song Shu text describes earlier precedents of the south-pointing chariot before the time of Ma Jun, this is not entirely credible, as there are no pre-Han or Han dynasty era texts that describe the device. In fact, the first known source to describe stories of its legendary use during the Zhou period was the Gu Jin Zhu book of Cui Bao (c. 300), written soon after the Three Kingdoms era. Cui Bao also wrote that the intricate details of construction for the device were once written in the Shang Fang Gu Shi (Traditions of the Imperial Workshops), but the book was lost by his time.

Japan

The invention of the south-pointing chariot also made its way to Japan by the 7th century. The Nihon Shoki (The Chronicles of Japan) of 720 described the earlier Chinese Buddhist monks Zhi Yu and Zhi You constructing several south-pointing Chariots for Emperor Tenji of Japan in 658. This was followed up by several more chariot devices built in 666 as well.

Song Shi

The south-pointing chariot was also combined with the earlier Han dynasty era invention of the odometer, a mechanical device used to measure distance traveled, and found in all modern automobiles. It was mentioned in the Song dynasty (960–1279) historical text of the Song Shi (compiled in 1345) that the engineers Yan Su (in 1027) and Wu Deren (in 1107) both created south-pointing chariots, which it details as follows. (In Needham's translation, inches and feet (ft) are used as units of distance. 1 inch is 25.4 millimetres. 1 ft is 12 inches or 304.8 mm.)

After this initial description of Yan Su's device, the text continues to describe the work of Wu Deren, who crafted a wheeled device that would combine the odometer and south-pointing chariot:

Chariots with differential gears

Background and explanation

The English engineer George Lanchester proposed that some south-pointing chariots employed differential gears. A differential is an assembly of gears, nowadays used in almost all automobiles except some electric and hybrid-electric ones, which has three shafts linking it to the external world. They are conveniently labelled A, B, and C. The gears cause the rotation speed of Shaft A to be proportional to the sum of the rotation speeds of Shafts B and C. There are no other limitations on the rotation speeds of the shafts.

In an automobile, Shaft A is connected to the engine (through the transmission), and Shafts B and C are connected to two road wheels, one on each side of the vehicle. When the vehicle turns, the wheel going around the outside of the turning curve has to roll further and rotate faster than the wheel on the inside. The differential permits this to happen while both wheels are being driven by the engine. If the sum of the speeds of the wheels is constant, the speed of the engine does not change.

In a south-pointing chariot, according to the hypothesis, Shaft B was connected to one road wheel and Shaft C was connected through a direction-reversing gear to the other road wheel. This made Shaft A rotate at a speed that was proportional to the difference between the rotation speeds of the two wheels. The pointing doll was connected (possibly through intermediate gears) to Shaft A. When the chariot moved in a straight line, the two wheels turned at equal speeds, and the doll did not rotate. When the chariot turned, the wheels rotated at different speeds (for the same reason as in an automobile), so the differential caused the doll to rotate, compensating for the turning of the chariot.

The hypothesis that there were south-pointing chariots with differential gears originated in the 20th century. People who were familiar with modern (e.g. automotive) uses of differentials interpreted some of the ancient Chinese descriptions in ways that agreed with their own ideas. Essentially, they re-invented the south-pointing chariot, as it had previously been re-invented several times in antiquity. Working chariots that use differentials have been constructed in recent decades. Whether any such chariots existed previously is not known with certainty.

Although the Antikythera mechanism is believed to have used differential gears, the first true differential gear definitely known to have been used was by Joseph Williamson in 1720. He used a differential for correcting the equation of time for a clock that displayed both mean and solar time.

Geometrical properties 
If the south-pointing chariot were built perfectly accurately, using a differential gear, and if it travelled on an Earth that was perfectly smooth, it would have interesting properties. It would be a mechanical compass that transports a direction, given by the pointer, along the path it travels. Mathematically the device performs parallel transport along the path it travels.

The chariot can be used to detect straight lines or geodesics. A path on a surface the chariot travels along is a geodesic if and only if the pointer does not rotate with respect to the base of the chariot.

Because of the curvature of the Earth's surface (due to it being curved around as a globe), the chariot would generally not continue to point due south as it moves. For example, if the chariot moves along a geodesic (as approximated by any great circle) the pointer should instead stay at a fixed angle to the path. Also, if two chariots travel by different routes between the same starting and finishing points, their pointers, which were aimed in the same direction at the start, usually do not point in the same direction at the finish. Likewise, if a chariot goes around a closed loop, starting and finishing at the same point on the Earth's surface, its pointer generally does not aim in the same direction at the finish as it did at the start. The difference is the holonomy of the path, and is proportional to the enclosed area. If the journeys are short compared with the radius of the Earth, these discrepancies are small and may have no practical importance. Nevertheless, they show that this type of chariot, based on differential gears, would be an imperfect compass even if constructed exactly and used in ideal conditions.

Lack of precision, and implications 
Real machines are never built perfectly accurately. Simple geometry shows that if the chariot's mechanism is based on a differential gear and if, for example, the width of the track of the chariot (the separation between its wheels) is three metres, and if the wheels are intended to be identical but actually differ in diameter by one part in a thousand, then if the chariot travels one kilometre in a straight line, the "south-pointing" figure will rotate nearly twenty degrees. If it initially points exactly to the south, at the end of the one-kilometre trip it will point almost to the south-southeast or south-southwest, depending on which wheel is the larger. If the chariot travels nine kilometres, the figure will end up pointing almost due north. Obviously, this would make it useless as a south-pointing compass. To be a useful navigational tool, the figure would have to rotate no more than a couple of degrees over a journey of a hundred kilometres, but this would require the chariot's wheels to be equal in diameter to within one part in a million. Even if the process of manufacturing the wheels were capable of this precision (which would not be possible with ancient Chinese methods), it is doubtful that the equality of the wheels could be maintained for long as they are subjected to the wear and tear of travelling across open country. Irregularity of the ground would add further errors to the device's functioning.

Considerable scepticism is therefore warranted as to whether this type of south-pointing chariot, using a differential gear for the whole time, was used in practice to navigate over long distances. Conceivably, the south-pointing doll was fixed to the body of the chariot while it was travelling in straight lines, and coupled to the differential only when the chariot was turning. The charioteer could have operated a control to do this just before and after making each turn, or maybe shouted commands to someone inside the chariot who connected and disconnected the doll and the differential. This could have been done without stopping the chariot. If turns were brief and rare, this would have greatly reduced the pointing errors, since they would have accumulated only during the short periods when the doll and differential were connected. However, it raises the problem of how the chariot could have been kept travelling in straight lines with sufficient accuracy without using the pointing doll.

If the real purposes of the chariot and the accounts of it were amusement and impressing visiting foreigners, rather than actual long-distance navigation, then its inaccuracy might not have been important.  Considering that a large mechanical wagon or chariot would be obligated to travel on roads, the destination in question would typically not be in an unknown direction.   The fact that the sources cited above mention that the chariot was placed at the front of processions, its high level of mechanical complexity and fragility, and that it was 'reinvented' several times contribute to the conclusion that it was not used for navigation, as a truly practical and useful navigational tool would not be forgotten or left unused.

Chariots without differential gears 

Although the hypothesis that the south-pointing chariot used differential gears has gained wide acceptance, it should be recognized that functional south-pointing chariots without differential gears are possible. The ancient descriptions are often unclear, but they suggest that the Chinese implemented several different designs, at least some of which did not include differentials.

Mechanical designs 

Some of the ancient descriptions suggest that some south-pointing chariots could move in only three ways: straight ahead, or turning left or right with a fixed radius of curvature. A third wheel might have been used to fix the turning radius. If the chariot was turning, the pointing doll was connected by gears to one or other of the two main road wheels (e.g. whichever was on the outside of the curve around which the chariot was moving) so the doll rotated at a fixed speed, relative to the rate of the chariot's movement, to compensate for the predetermined rate of turn. The doll turned in opposite directions depending on which road wheel was connected to it, so its rotation compensated for the chariot turning left or right. This design would have been simpler than using a differential gear.

The chariots of Yan Su and Wu Deren appear to have used this type of mechanism. (See descriptions quoted from the Song Shi, above.) Apart from the presence of components in Wu Deren's vehicle to make it function as an odometer, there were only minor differences between them. In each chariot, the two main road wheels were attached to vertical gear wheels. A large horizontal gear wheel was linked (possibly via intermediate gearing) to the pointing doll, and was positioned so a diameter almost spanned the space between the uppermost points of the vertical gear wheels. When the chariot was moving straight ahead, there was no connection between these gears, but when the chariot turned, a small gear wheel was lowered into contact with the horizontal gear and one of the vertical gears, thus linking the doll to one of the road wheels. Two small gear wheels were available, one to connect the horizontal gear to each of the vertical ones. Of course, they were not used simultaneously. The small gear wheels were raised and lowered by an arrangement of weights, pulleys and cords which were attached to the pole to which the horses that pulled the chariot were harnessed. When the horses moved to one side or the other, in order to turn the chariot, the pole moved and the cords lowered the appropriate small gear wheel into its working position. When the horses returned to walking straight ahead, the small gear wheel was raised out of contact with the main horizontal and vertical gears. Thus the system functioned automatically. The mirror-symmetry of the vertical gears being linked by the small gears to the horizontal gear at diametrically opposite points caused the horizontal gear to rotate in opposite directions depending on which road wheel was linked to it, thus rotating the pointing doll in opposite directions when the chariot turned left and right.

The description does not mention a third road wheel to fix the turning radius, but it is possible that such a wheel was present. No gears would have been attached to it, so perhaps the author of the description did not mention it because he did not realize that it was an important part of the mechanism. Putting such a wheel on the chariot and making it function properly would not have been difficult. It might have been attached to the pole to which the horses were harnessed. Stops would have been provided to limit the motions of the pole to left and right.

If a third road wheel was included, this type of south-pointing chariot could have worked quite accurately as a compass when used for short journeys under good conditions, but if used for long journeys it would have been subject to cumulative errors, like chariots using the differential mechanism.

If in fact there was no third road wheel, the chariot might have functioned as a compass if turns were always made so that one of the two wheels was stationary and only the other rotated, with the pointing doll connected to it by gears. The charioteer could have kept the stationary wheel from turning by controlling the horses appropriately. (A brake would have helped, but there is no mention of one in the description.) The radius of the curve around which the rotating wheel moved would have equalled the track-width of the chariot, and the gears turning the doll would have been chosen accordingly. This design would have worked as a compass for short journeys, but would have suffered from cumulative errors if used for long ones. Also, the chariot would have been slow and awkward to turn. This might not have mattered if turns were rarely executed.

The Song Shi description of the gears in Yan Su's chariot, and the numbers of teeth on them, suggests that it worked this way, without a third road wheel. The gear ratios would have been correct if the pointing doll was attached directly to the large horizontal gear wheel, and the track-width of the chariot equalled the diameter of the road wheels. Wu Deren's chariot also appears to have been designed to work this way. The width of the chariot, and therefore presumably the track-width, was greater than the diameter of the wheels. The gear ratios were appropriate for these dimensions.

The charioteer would have had to use great skill to ensure that the radius of each turn of the chariot was correct to make one of the wheels exactly stop rotating. Unless he did this correctly, the pointing doll would not have kept aiming to the south. He would have been able to adjust the direction in which it aimed by making turns that were more or less sharp. This would sometimes have given him opportunities to use the chariot dishonestly. If it was being demonstrated to spectators, for example, and was being driven around in front of them, making many turns, the charioteer, who would have known which way was south, would have been able to make the chariot appear to work extremely accurately as a compass for long periods. The spectators could have been shown the machinery, and would have seen that the charioteer could not manipulate the doll. They would presumably have been impressed by the apparent accuracy of the mechanism. It is possible that this type of chariot was sometimes constructed with the prime purpose of fraudulently impressing spectators. Possibly, people who built these chariots deceived their own employers with them, which could have gained them fame and fortune provided nobody tried using the chariots for real navigation.

Other mechanical designs for the south-pointing chariot are also possible, including ones that employ a device that is used today, the gyrocompass. However, there is no indication that the ancient Chinese knew of these.

Non-mechanical possibilities 

Some south-pointing chariots may not have been purely mechanical devices. Someone riding inside the chariot may have used some non-mechanical method of determining the compass directions, and turned the doll on top of the chariot accordingly. There are several methods that could have been used, for example:

 By using a magnetic compass. The Chinese were using this for navigation by the 11th century, when south-pointing chariots were still being made and used.
 By using astronomical observations of the Sun and/or stars, e.g. the Pole Star. Chinese astronomical knowledge was extensive.
 By using local knowledge. The person in the chariot may have known the area or had a map or description of it.
 By observing the polarization of light from the sky. Vikings used birefringent crystals of Iceland spar to navigate across the Atlantic Ocean by this method at about the same time. Iceland spar is found in China, as well as in Iceland and some other places. Insects such as bees can respond to sky polarization and use it to find their way home. Whether the Chinese used it is hypothetical, but it is certainly possible.
 By observing light that had been refracted by the Earth's atmosphere. This is one of the techniques that were used by Polynesian navigators to steer ships among Pacific islands. When the surface of the Earth, ocean or ground, is colder than the air above it, a dense layer of air is formed near the surface, which refracts light downward. The result is that light can go around the curvature of the Earth, allowing things to be seen at much greater distances than simple geometry would predict. The images are very distorted, but they can be recognized by skilled navigators. Certain other Polynesian techniques can also be used on land and may have been employed by the Chinese.

Unlike mechanisms that rely on the rotation of road wheels, most of these methods can be used at sea. This may account for the mention (see "Earliest sources" above) that a marine version of the south-pointing chariot existed.

These methods can work accurately over long distances, unlike the mechanical designs for the chariot.

Necessity of non-mechanical orientation

Some non-mechanical method of finding the south must have been used when a mechanical south-pointing chariot was initialized, aiming its pointer to the south at the start of a journey. Any of the methods mentioned above in "Non-mechanical possibilities" could have been used.

If any south-pointing chariot was really used for long-distance navigation, it must have relied (after initialization) on a non-mechanical direction-finding method. It might have been operated non-mechanically by someone riding in it, as outlined above. Alternatively, if it had a mechanical mechanism, it must have been frequently re-initialized non-mechanically to eliminate accumulated errors and uncertainties.

The only chariots that might not have needed non-mechanical methods of finding the south would have been those that were never used for long-distance navigation. If some chariots were used only for amusement or fraud, they could have worked purely mechanically. Even initialization could have been avoided by simply declaring some arbitrary direction to be "south".

Modern replicas 
While none of the historic south-pointing chariots remain, full sized replicas can be found.

The History Museum in Beijing, China, holds a replica based on the mechanism of Yen Su (1027).
The National Palace Museum in Taipei, Taiwan, holds a replica based on the Lanchester mechanism of 1932.

Referred to as the "southern pointing man", two replicas can also be seen (and physically experimented with) at the Ontario Science Centre in Toronto, Canada.

See also
 Chariots in ancient China
 Chinese war wagon
 History of science and technology in China
 List of Chinese inventions
 Mechanical engineering

Notes

References 
The Chinese South-Seeking chariot: A simple mechanical device for visualizing curvature and parallel transport M. Santander, American Journal of Physics – September 1992 – Volume 60, Issue 9, pp. 782–787
Needham, Joseph (1986). Science and Civilization in China: Volume 4, Part 2. Taipei: Caves Books, Ltd.
Kit Williams, Engines of Ingenuity, Gingko Press (February 2002),

External links 

 South Pointing Things – Useful site with lot of info, images and plans for building chariots
 RLT – Fully functional model kit
 A video of a 3D model of an open differential

Chariots
Chinese inventions
Chinese mythology
Human-powered vehicles
Mechanical engineering
Military vehicles of China
Vehicle technology
Warhorses